Ardeola is an unincorporated community in Stoddard County, in the U.S. state of Missouri.

History
A post office called Ardeola was established in 1889, and remained in operation until 1949. The source of the name "Ardeola" is unknown.

In 1925, Ardeola had 156 inhabitants.

References

Unincorporated communities in Stoddard County, Missouri
Unincorporated communities in Missouri
1889 establishments in Missouri